Paist is  a surname. Notable people with the name include:

Henrietta Barclay Paist (1870–1930), American painter and porcelain artist
Phineas Paist (1873–1937), American architect